Courtney Gilmour is a Canadian stand-up comedian, whose performances centre on her experiences as a congenital triple amputee. She is most noted as the joint winner with D.J. Mausner of the annual Homegrown Comics competition for emerging Canadian comedians at the 2017 Just for Laughs festival.

Born in Sarnia, Ontario, and raised in Waterloo, Gilmour was born without forearms and with only one leg. She began pursuing comedy while studying at the University of Windsor.

Following her Homegrown Comics win, she performed in 2018 at the Winnipeg Comedy Festival and the Halifax Comedy Festival. In 2019 she premiered the one-woman stage show Congratulations at the Toronto Fringe Festival.

In 2021 she appeared as herself in an episode of Jon Dore's CBC comedy series Humour Resources. She has also appeared in The Beaverton, The Stand-Up Show with Katherine Ryan, and the web series Space Dragon and Kim.

In 2022 she competed in the second season of Canada's Got Talent, and was announced on April 26, 2022, as advancing to the semi-final round, and winning the judges vote to the finale. She also appeared in two episodes of the second season of Roast Battle Canada.

Her comedy album Let Me Hold Your Baby received a Juno Award nomination for Comedy Album of the Year at the Juno Awards of 2023.

References

External links

21st-century Canadian comedians
Canadian stand-up comedians
Canadian women comedians
Canadian amputees
People from Waterloo, Ontario
Comedians from Ontario
Living people
Canada's Got Talent contestants
University of Windsor alumni
Year of birth missing (living people)